Indian Wells is a city in Riverside County, California, United States, in the Coachella Valley. Incorporated in 1967, it lies in between the cities of Palm Desert and La Quinta. As of the 2010 Census, the city population was 4,958.

The city hosts the sixth-largest tennis tournament in the world, the Indian Wells Masters tennis tournament, presently known as the BNP Paribas Open. The Indian Wells Masters is one of nine ATP World Tour Masters 1000 high-level events operated by the Association of Tennis Professionals, and one of the four WTA Premier Mandatory tournaments of the Women's Tennis Association. It is held at the Indian Wells Tennis Garden, which contains the second-largest tennis-specific stadium in the world.

History
As early as 1820, the area now known as Indian Wells was the site of a thriving Indian village, as reported by W.P. Blade, a Smithsonian Institution geologist. A decade later, when gold was discovered on the Colorado River, William D. Bradshaw built a trail from Los Angeles through the desert to the gold mines. The Alexander and Company Stage Line used the trail to transport prospectors and Indian Wells became an important stop along the trail. Competition from the Southern Pacific Railroad caused the route to be abandoned briefly in 1875 before being reactivated by the Wells Fargo company the following year.

Over the next decades, settlers gradually arrived in the area and date palm ranches became profitable. The area's first golf courses were opened in the 1950s at the Eldorado Country Club and the Indian Wells Country Club. In 1957, Desi Arnaz opened his Indian Wells Hotel (forerunner to the Indian Wells Resort Hotel). In 1960, Arnold Palmer won the first Bob Hope Desert Classic golf tournament. President Dwight D. Eisenhower was a regular Indian Wells visitor and later an Eldorado homeowner.

In an election held June 27, 1967, to avoid being annexed by neighboring cities such as Palm Desert, the inhabitants of Indian Wells voted to incorporate as a city. On July 14, 1967, Indian Wells became California's 400th city and the 16th in Riverside County. Since then, Indian Wells has continued to grow, with the development of resort hotels, golf courses and luxury residential areas.

Demographics

2010
The 2010 United States Census reported that Indian Wells had a population of 4,958. The racial makeup of Indian Wells was 4,721 (95.2%) White (92.3% Non-Hispanic White), 29 (0.6%) African American, 20 (0.4%) Native American, 83 (1.7%) Asian, 2 (0.0%) Pacific Islander, 52 (1.0%) from other races, and 51 (1.0%) from two or more races. Hispanic or Latino of any race were 209 persons (4.2%).

The Census reported that 4,952 people (99.9% of the population) lived in households, 6 (0.1%) lived in non-institutionalized group quarters, and 0 (0%) were institutionalized.

There were 2,745 households, out of which 193 (7.0%) had children under the age of 18 living in them, 1,519 (55.3%) were opposite-sex married couples living together, 85 (3.1%) had a female householder with no husband present, 46 (1.7%) had a male householder with no wife present. There were 85 (3.1%) unmarried opposite-sex partnerships, and 36 (1.3%) same-sex married couples or partnerships. 944 households (34.4%) were made up of individuals, and 690 (25.1%) had someone living alone who was 65 years of age or older. The average household size was 1.80. There were 1,650 families (60.1% of all households); the average family size was 2.22.

The age distribution was: 310 people (6.3%) under the age of 18, 76 people (1.5%) aged 18 to 24, 283 people (5.7%) aged 25 to 44, 1,558 people (31.4%) aged 45 to 64, and 2,731 people (55.1%) who were 65 years of age or older. The median age was 66.7 years. For every 100 females, there were 84.6 males. For every 100 females age 18 and over, there were 84.2 males.

The homeowner vacancy rate was 5.1%; the rental vacancy rate was 15.4%. 4,251 people (85.7% of the population) lived in owner-occupied housing units and 701 people (14.1%) lived in rental housing units.

During 2009–2013, Indian Wells had a median household income of $83,884, with 5.2% of the population living below the federal poverty line.

2000
As of the census of 2000, there were 3,816 people, 1,982 households, and 1,323 families residing in the city. The racial makeup of the city was 96.3% White, 1.5% Asian, 0.4% Black or African American, 0.2% Native American, 0.1% Pacific Islander, 0.5% from other races, and 1.0% from two or more races. 3.0% of the population were Hispanic or Latino of any race.

There were 1,982 households, out of which 8.4% had children under the age of 18 living with them, 63.1% were married couples living together, 3.0% had a female householder with no husband present, and 33.2% were non-families. 28.4% of all households were made up of individuals, and 17.6% had someone living alone who was 65 years of age or older. The average household size was 1.9 and the average family size was 2.3.

The age distribution is 7.6% under the age of 18, 1.5% from 18 to 24, 9.4% from 25 to 44, 35.3% from 45 to 64, and 46.2% who were 65 years of age or older. The median age was 63 years. For every 100 females, there were 89.5 males. For every 100 females age 18 and over, there were 89.3 males.

The median income for a household in the city was $93,986, and the median income for a family was $119,110. Males had a median income of $88,709 versus $49,539 for females. The per capita income for the city was $76,187. About 1.2% of families and 3.4% of the population were below the poverty line, including none of those under age 18 and 2.6% of those age 65 or over.

Geography
Indian Wells is located at  (33.715755, −116.341109).

Climate
This climate is dominated in all months by the subtropical anticyclone, or subtropical high, with its descending air, elevated inversions, and clear skies. Such an atmospheric environment inhibits precipitation.

Politics
Indian Wells is a largely Republican city. Since its incorporation in 1967, all Republican candidates for president and governor have carried Indian Wells, with the six Republican presidential candidates from 1968 to 1988, and the seven Republican gubernatorial candidates from 1970 to 1994 each carrying the city by a margin of at least 53 points.

Even as both the state of California and Riverside County trended more Democratic from the 1990s onward, the Republican presidential and gubernatorial candidates have continued to carry Indian Wells by large, albeit smaller margins.

The GOP also retains a very strong voter registration advantage in the city. As of August 30, 2021, there are 3,343 registered voters in the city of Indian Wells. Of these voters, 1,720 (51.45%) are registered Republicans, 868 (25.96%) are registered Democrats, and 557 (16.66%) are not registered with a political party. Indian Wells is one of three incorporated cities in Riverside County where the Republican party retains an outright majority of registered voters as of August 30, 2021, the other two being Canyon Lake and Norco.

Representation

People
 Desi Arnaz† – singer, actor and developer 
 Robert "Bob" Cummings† – actor
 Tony Curtis† – actor
 Ernest E. Debs† – Los Angeles City Council member and Los Angeles County supervisor
 Bob Einstein† – actor, comedy writer and producer
 Dwight D. Eisenhower† – former U.S. president and avid golfer
 Don Fairfield – golfer
 Howard Haugerud† – military pilot, diplomat, businessman and educator
 Skip Homeier† – actor
 Colleen Kay Hutchins† – former Miss America
 Jack Jones – singer
 Robert Kardashian† – lawyer
 Charles Koch – businessman
 Arthur Lake† – actor
 W. Howard Lester† – businessman
 Cargill MacMillan Jr.† – businessman†
 Curt Massey† - musician
 Charles Peebler† – advertising executive
 Roger Perry† – actor
 Robert Prescott† - Founder of the Flying Tiger Line
 Charles H. Price II† – businessman and former ambassador
 Tommy Shepard† – trombonist and orchestra leader
 Kenneth Simonds† – businessman
 Ernie Vandeweghe† – physician, U.S. Air Force veteran and basketball player; husband of Colleen Kay Hutchins
 Sam B. Williams† – inventor and businessman
 John Wilson – golfer

† Deceased

References

External links

 
 The Desert Sun, Coachella Valley Newspaper
 

 
Cities in Riverside County, California
Incorporated cities and towns in California
Bradshaw Trail
Populated places established in 1967
1967 establishments in California